Chamonixia is a genus of truffle-like fungi in the family Boletaceae. The genus is widely distributed, especially in temperate regions, and contains eight species. Chamonixia was circumscribed by French mycologist Léon Louis Rolland in 1899.

References

Boletaceae
Truffles (fungi)
Boletales genera
Taxa described in 1899